The Elder Scrolls Travels: Shadowkey is a role-playing game developed by Vir2L Studios exclusively for N-Gage.

Plot
The player character, an unnamed resident of Azra's Crossing, Hammerfell, is tasked with defeating the Umbra'Keth—a powerful "Shadow of Conflict" created by the ongoing War of the Bendr'Mahk. To this end, the protagonist must gather the seven Star Teeth, ancient crystals infused with the magical power of the sky. Meanwhile, both the Imperial Battlemage Jagar Tharn and Shadowmage Pergan Asuul are independently searching for the Star Teeth in order to bind the Umbra'Keth to their will.

Development
The game was announced in May 2004. The Shadowkey development team consisted of 15 members from Vir2L Studios, Bethesda Softworks, TKO and Nokia.

Reception
{{Video game reviews
|rev1=GameSpy
|rev1Score=3/5
|rev2=GameSpot
|rev2Score=6.1/10
|rev3=1Up.com
|rev3Score=6/10
|rev4=GameZone|rev4Score=6.9/10
}}

The Elder Scrolls Travels: Shadowkey received generally mixed reviews from critics, and holds a score of 59 on Metacritic.

Avery Score of GameSpot criticized the game's controls, combat system, and short draw distance, feeling the gameplay to be "crippled" by N-Gage's technological limitations. He also dismissed the storyline as "unremarkable", but praised the game's co-op multiplayer mode and the use of the soundtrack from Morrowind''.

External links

References

2004 video games
Bethesda Softworks games
N-Gage games
Video games developed in the United States
Video game spin-offs
Role-playing video games
Vir2L Studios games